Dine Potter (born 4 September 1975) is an Antigua and Barbuda sprinter. She competed in the women's 4 × 100 metres relay at the 1996 Summer Olympics.

References

1975 births
Living people
Athletes (track and field) at the 1996 Summer Olympics
Antigua and Barbuda female sprinters
Olympic athletes of Antigua and Barbuda
Place of birth missing (living people)
Olympic female sprinters